Keith Williams (born 14 January 1937) is a footballer who played as inside forward for Everton, Tranmere Rovers, Plymouth Argyle and Bristol Rovers. Williams joined Everton from school, but transferred to Tranmere in May 1957, joining his brother Ray there. He scored 88 goals in 161 Football League appearances during his four seasons at Tranmere, but conflict with manager Walter Galbraith led to his being transfer-listed. Williams moved to Plymouth at the end of the 1960–61 season, then to Bristol Rovers soon after. He was then banned due to a bribery scandal. In 1962, Keith moved with Ray to South Africa to set up business there.

References

1937 births
Living people
People from Eastham, Merseyside
Association football inside forwards
English footballers
Everton F.C. players
Tranmere Rovers F.C. players
Plymouth Argyle F.C. players
Bristol Rovers F.C. players
English Football League players
Sportspeople involved in betting scandals